Gus van Go is a music producer, mixer, and musician. He is best known for his work with the Montreal band The Stills, with credits for production, mixing, writing and arranging three albums and one EP with the band. He has also produced and mixed material for a number or artists, including Arkells, The Sam Roberts Band, Whitehorse, Wintersleep, Michael Rault, Terra Lightfoot, Hollerado, Said The Whale, The Trews, and Priestess. He is also a member of the band Megative, along with Tim Fletcher (ex-lead-singer of The Stills) and Jamaican reggae vocalist Screechy Dan.

Early life
van Go (born Gustavo Coriandoli), was born in Mar Del Plata, Argentina. His family subsequently moved to Montreal and he is now a naturalized Canadian citizen.

Career
van Go began his musical career as lead-singer/guitarist for the Montreal cult-band Me Mom & Morgentaler. The band established a following in the 1990s, and was known for its extravagant and theatrical live shows. In 1999, over 10,000 attended the band's reunion concert in Quebec City.
 
In 2001, he moved to New York City, where he met musician and producer Werner F. The two began working together in 2003 when they produced The Stills’ debut album Logic Will Break Your Heart, which received favorable reviews from critics. In 2006 they built The Boiler Room Studio in the Williamsburg neighborhood of Brooklyn, NY, where they've since produced and mixed many albums including Fast Romantics, Monster Truck, Matt Mays, Glorious Sons, The Elwins, Michael Rault, as well as many popular French language artists from Quebec like Les Trois Accords and Cowboys Fringants.

Van Go currently divides his time between his Brooklyn and Montreal studios.

Awards and Discography 
Van Go was personally nominated for a Juno award in 2018 for his work with the group Whitehorse and Singer-songwriter Terra Lightfoot. Both artists’ albums were also nominated for Best Album in the Adult Alternative category that year, each produced and mixed by Gus van Go and his partner Werner F.

He was nominated for an Engineer Of The Year Juno award in 2015 for the Whitehorse album Leave No Bridge Unburned, which took home the Juno award for Alternative Album of the Year.

In 2015, he produced and mixed the album ‘’Octobre by French-language neo-trad band Les Cowboys Fringants which reached #1 in the Quebec charts, attained gold-record status, and was awarded Rock Album of the Year at the 2016 ADISQ awards ceremonies.

In 2013 and 2010, he was nominated for Producer of The Year at Quebec’s ADISQ awards for his work with Les Trois Accords.Oceans Will Rise, the third release from The Stills, was awarded a Juno Award for 'Alternative Album of the Year' during the 2009 Juno Awards Gala on March 28, 2009. In 2008, Vulgaires Machins’ Compter Les Corps'' (another Gus van Go & Werner F production) was nominated for a Juno Award for "Best French-Language Album".

Selected discography (P = Produced, M = Mixed)

References

External links 
 M pour Montreal 
 Musique Plus

1969 births
Living people
Argentine emigrants to Canada
Canadian indie rock musicians
Canadian record producers
People from Mar del Plata